The Eleventh Hour is the fourth full-length studio album by the band Jars of Clay. It was released in 2002 by Essential Records and marked the band's first attempt at producing a full album by themselves.

Overview
When writing the group's fourth album, Jars of Clay enlisted Dennis Herring, who produced the band's If I Left the Zoo album, to produce, but due to scheduling difficulties, Herring decided to pull out of the project, leading to the band's first attempt at producing by themselves. Though not initially intending to produce the album themselves, the group took on this and many other aspects of putting the album together they had not before, such as artwork and even filming Ten:Thirty: The Making of The Eleventh Hour video.

The Eleventh Hour is considered a return to Jars of Clay's original sound, though in truth it bore stylistic similarities to all three of the albums preceding it, and continued the trend of favoring poetic lyrics over straightforwardly "Christian" lyrics (with lead single "I Need You" being a notable exception, reflecting a trend toward more direct and simplistic "worship songs" that had become popular in Christian music at around the start of the 21st century). The electric guitar was a more notable presence here than on past albums as well.

The song "Fly" had limited success at mainstream radio, but by this point, Jars of Clay was much less visible in mainstream music than they had been in the mid-nineties. The album was recorded in the band's own Sputnik Studio, and they self-produced it in addition to doing all of the photography and artwork on their own, even down to using the programs to design the cover. This was the first time that they had produced their own material since the self-titled album.

The album's tour was later recorded and released as a DVD known as 11Live, which featured the same cover artwork as The Eleventh Hour. Later, the group re-recorded many songs from the first four albums and released these studio sessions along with the live performances as Furthermore: From the Studio, From the Stage. "Something Beautiful" and "The Eleventh Hour" were the only songs from The Eleventh Hour that were included on the studio portion of the release, while "The Eleventh Hour" appeared a second time on the live performance (the only song to appear twice, on track five of each disc) and "Disappear", "I Need You", "Fly" and "Revolution". In 2007, the group parted from Essential Records and Sony BMG, Essential's parent company, decided to release a greatest hits collection as part of their The Essential series. The Essential Jars of Clay features four songs from The Eleventh Hour which are the singles "I Need You", "Fly" and "Revolution" and the album's track "Silence".

Honors
 The Eleventh Hour earned the band a third consecutive Grammy Award in the Best Pop/Contemporary Gospel Album category in 2002.
 The Eleventh Hour won Best Modern Rock Album at 2003's Dove Awards.

Album artwork
The album cover of The Eleventh Hour is a photograph of Seattle taken by Dan Haseltine from a hotel window looking down the Pike Place Market. All of the artwork was created jointly by the band, as the group wanted to put together an album that they had created, after being prompted to produce the album with the departure of Dennis Herring from the producer position before pre-production had begun.

Track listing
 "Disappear" – 3:56
 "Something Beautiful" – 3:46
 "Revolution" – 3:42
 "Fly" – 3:20
 "I Need You" – 3:40
 "Silence" – 5:17
 "Scarlet" – 3:32
 "Whatever She Wants" – 3:43
 "The Eleventh Hour" – 4:27
 "These Ordinary Days" – 3:04
 "The Edge of Water" – 3:54

Personnel

Jars of Clay 
 Dan Haseltine – vocals, percussion, tambourine 
 Charlie Lowell – keyboards, accordion, backing vocals 
 Stephen Mason – electric guitars, backing vocals 
 Matt Odmark – acoustic guitars, backing vocals

Additional musicians

 Tab Laven – banjo (11)
 Aaron Sands – bass (1, 3, 4, 5, 7)
 Chris Donahue – bass (2, 8, 11)
 Joe Porter – drums (1, 3, 4, 7)
 Shawn McWilliams – drums (2, 5-11)
 John Catchings – cello (2, 6, 11)
 Fleming Painter – guest vocals (7)

Production

 Jars of Clay – producers, photography 
 Robert Beeson – executive producer
 Vance Powell – engineer, recording 
 Mitch Dane – recording (3), second engineer
 Jeremy Cottrell – second engineer
 Josh Williams – second engineer
 Sputnik Sound, Franklin, Tennessee – recording studio
 The Playground, Nashville, Tennessee – recording studio
 FrontPage Studios, Hollywood, California – recording studio
 Jack Joseph Puig – mixing at Ocean Way Recording, Hollywood, California
 Bob Ludwig – mastering at Gateway Mastering, Portland, Maine
 Dan Haseltine – art direction, cover concept 
 Richie Edwards – design, layout 
 Sam Shifley – photography 
 Kristin Barlowe – back panel photography

Charts

References

Jars of Clay albums
Essential Records (Christian) albums
2002 albums
Grammy Award for Best Pop/Contemporary Gospel Album